Sekyere Kumawu District is one of the forty-three districts in Ashanti Region, Ghana. Originally it was part of the then-larger Sekyere East District, which was created from the former Sekyere District Council. Later, a large portion of the district was split off to create the 1st Sekyere Afram Plains District on 1 November 2007 (inaugurated on 29 February 2008), with Kumawu as its capital town. However on 28 June 2012, the Afram Plains area of the district was split off to create the new Sekyere Afram Plains District, with Dobrosno as its capital town; while the remaining part has since then been officially renamed as Sekyere Kumawu District, with Kumawu as its capital town. The district assembly is located in the eastern part of Ashanti Region and has Kumawu as its capital town.

Educational Facilities
As at 2014  the District had  a total of 55 Kindergartens, 55 Primary Schools, 45 Junior High Schools and 4 Senior  High Schools. Also is a Vocational Technical School. There are 2 Tertiary Institutions and 3 Libraries.

Towns

 Kumawu
 Bodomase
 Oyoko
 Banko
 Dadease
 Sekyere
 Besoro
 Asekyerewa
 Abotanso
 Bodwease
 Wonoo
 Pepease
 Woraso
 Akrokyere
 Akronfoso
 Akotosu
 Temate
 Aninya
 Ntarentare
 Bahankra

References 

Districts of Ashanti Region